Raja Kempu Roja is a 1990 Indian Kannada-language action drama film directed, written and edited by S. Umesh and produced by Raviraj. The stars features Tiger Prabhakar, Malashri and Tara. The film's music was composed by Upendra Kumar.

Cast 
 Tiger Prabhakar
 Malashri 
 Raviraj
 Vajramuni
 Tara
 Sundar Krishna Urs
 Dheerendra Gopal
 Shivaram
 M. S. Umesh
 Tennis Krishna
 Dinesh
 Vishwa Vijetha
 Bank Janardhan
 Mysore Lokesh

Soundtrack 
The soundtrack of the film was composed by Upendra Kumar.

References 

1990 films
1990s Kannada-language films
Indian action films
1990 action films